Juicio Final (1993) (Spanish for "Final Judgement" 1993) were a pair of professional wrestling supercard shows, scripted and produced by Consejo Mundial de Lucha Libre (CMLL). The two shows took place on December 3 and December 10, 1993, in Arena México, Mexico City, Mexico. The shows served as the year-end finale for CMLL before Arena México, CMLL's main venue, closed down for the winter for renovations and to host  Circo Atayde . The shows replaced the regular Super Viernes ("Super Friday") shows held by CMLL since the mid-1930s.

The main event of the December 3 show was a Luchas de Apuestas, or bet match, which is considered a higher profile match type than a championship match in Lucha Libre. The match saw Mano Negra defeated Bestia Salvaje, two falls to one, to win the match. Afterwards Bestia Salvaje was forced to stand in the middle of the ring as his hair was shaved off in accordance with lucha libre traditions. That show featured four additional matches

For the December 10 show, Kato Kung Lee and Mocho Cota both risked their hair in another Lucha de Apuestas, hair vs. hair match, that saw Cota cheat to defeat Kato Kung Lee. As a result Lee was shaved bald afterwards. On the undercard Último Dragón successfully defended the UWA World Middleweight Championship against El Felino. The December 10 show featured three additional matches.

Production

Background
For decades Arena México, the main venue of the Mexican professional wrestling promotion Consejo Mundial de Lucha Libre (CMLL), would close down in early December and remain closed into either January or February to allow for renovations as well as letting Circo Atayde occupy the space over the holidays. As a result CMLL usually held a "end of the year" supercard show on the first or second Friday of December in lieu of their normal Super Viernes show. 1989 is the first year where CMLL used the name "El Juicio Final" ("The Final Judgement") for their year end supershow.December 8, 1989 It is no longer an annually recurring show, but instead held intermittently sometimes several years apart and not always in the same month of the year either. All Juicio Final shows have been held in Arena México in Mexico City, Mexico which is CMLL's main venue, its "home".

Storylines

The 1993 Juicio Final shows featured ten professional wrestling matches in total, all scripted by CMLL with some wrestlers involved in scripted feuds. The wrestlers portray either heels (referred to as rudos in Mexico, those that play the part of the "bad guys") or faces (técnicos in Mexico, the "good guy" characters) as they perform.

Results December 3, 1993

Results December 10, 1993

References

1993 in Mexico
1993 in professional wrestling
CMLL Juicio Final